Nicola Pierce is an Irish writer and ghost writer.

Life

Born in Tallaght, Dublin, Nicola Pierce has worked and lived in Drogheda since 2011. Pierce attended the Presentation Schools in Terenure and got an Arts Modular degree from University College Dublin. Her books are aimed at children and young adults. Almost all her books are historical fiction although she has been asked to write history books about some of these historical events. Her first novel ‘Spirit of the Titanic’ was selected for seven different ‘One Book One Community’ Projects. In 2014 her second novel ‘City of Fate’, about World War Two’s Battle of Stalingrad, was considered for the Warwickshire Year Nine Book Award. This novel was followed by ‘Behind the Walls’ about the 1688–89 Siege of Derry. Her 2017 novel ‘Kings of the Boyne’ was shortlisted for 2017 LAI Children’s Book Award. In the middle of writing her fifth children’s novel, in February 2018, Pierce was diagnosed with stage 3 breast cancer, finally finishing treatment in 2019. During that time, she released the non-fiction ‘Titanic, True Stories of Her Passengers, Crew and Legacy’.
Her fifth novel, about the doomed 1845 John Franklin and Captain Francis Crozier expedition to the Arctic, ‘Chasing Ghosts, An Arctic Adventure’ was finally released in March 2020.

Bibliography

 Behind the Walls
 City of Fate
 Kings of the Boyne
 Spirit of the Titanic
 Titanic: True Stories of her Passengers, Crew and Legacy
 Ballymena: City of the Seven Towers
 Coleraine: A Short History (Hardback)
 Lisburn: Phoenix from the Flames
 Chasing Ghosts-An Arctic Adventure

Ghostwritten

 I Was a Boy in Belsen
 Nobody Will Believe You
 Mother From Hell

Anthologies

 Reading The Future: New Writing From Ireland
 The Danger and The Glory

References and sources

1969 births
21st-century Irish women writers
Writers from Dublin (city)
Alumni of University College Dublin
Ghostwriters
Irish children's writers
Irish women children's writers
Living people